Vnukovo may refer to:
 Vnukovo International Airport
 Vnukovo (Moscow Metro)
 Vnukovo District